Royal Crown Revue was a band formed in 1989 in Los Angeles, California. They have been credited with starting the swing revival movement.

Career
The band contained Mark and Adam Stern. Other members included Daniel Glass, Scott Steen, James Achor, Veikko Lepisto, and  Bill Ungerman.

After appearing in the movie The Mask, Royal Crown Revue began a residency at the Derby in Los Angeles.

Discography
 Kings of Gangster Bop (Big Daddy, 1991)
 Mugzy's Move (Warner Bros., 1996)
 Caught in the Act (Surfdog, 1997)
 The Contender (Warner Bros., 1998)
 Walk On Fire (SideOneDummy, 1999)
 Passport to Australia (2001)

References

External links 
Daniel Glass official site

Musical groups established in 1989
American jazz ensembles from California
American swing musical groups
Jump blues musicians
Swing revival ensembles
BYO Records artists